CCIS may refer to:
 Centennial Centre for Interdisciplinary Science, a building at the University of Alberta
 Cleveland Council of Independent Schools
 Common Channel Interoffice Signaling
 Comprehensive Case Information System, in the Florida justice system
 The College of Computer and Information Science, one of the colleges at Northeastern University in Boston, United States.